Club Atlético Ñuñorco is an Argentine football club located in Monteros of Tucumán Province. The team currently plays in the regional Liga Tucumana de Fútbol, having also played in the Torneo Argentino A some years ago.

Titles
 Liga Tucumana de Fútbol: 16'''

External links

Liga Tucumana de Fútbol  

Football clubs in Tucumán Province
Association football clubs established in 1941
1941 establishments in Argentina